Andrea Procaccio (born 11 January 1996) is an Italian professional footballer who plays as a winger for  club Mantova.

Club career
Formed on Juventus and Bra youth sector, Procaccio made his senior debut in 2014 for Eccellenza club GSD Volpiano.

Between 2015 and 2018 he played for Serie D clubs Pro Eureka and Borgosesia.

On 12 July 2018, he signed for Serie C club Triestina. He made his professional debut on 18 September against Vis Pesaro.

On 22 July 2022, Procaccio signed a three-year contract with Mantova.

References

External links
 
 

1994 births
Living people
People from Chivasso
Sportspeople from the Metropolitan City of Turin
Footballers from Piedmont
Italian footballers
Association football wingers
Serie C players
Serie D players
Eccellenza players
U.S. Triestina Calcio 1918 players
Mantova 1911 players